As of 2018, several firms in the United States rank among the world's biggest publishers of books in terms of revenue: Cengage Learning, HarperCollins, Houghton Mifflin Harcourt, McGraw-Hill Education, Scholastic, Simon & Schuster, and Wiley.

History 

In 1640 in Cambridge, Massachusetts, Stephen Daye produced the first book printed in British North America, the Bay Psalm Book.

The American Library Association formed in 1876, and the Bibliographical Society of America in 1904. The national Center for the Book began in 1977.

Types 
 Children's books: United States and List of American children's books
 American cookbooks
 Astronomy books

Bookselling 

Popular books in the 19th century included Sheldon's In His Steps (1896). 20th century bestsellers included Mitchell's Gone with the Wind (1936), Carnegie's How to Win Friends and Influence People (1937), Spock's Common Sense Book of Baby and Child Care (1946), Harris' I'm OK – You're OK (1969), Woodward and Bernstein's All the President's Men (1974). Recent bestsellers have included Warren's Purpose-Driven Life (2002) and Brown's Da Vinci Code (2003).

The influential "New York Times Best Seller list" first appeared in 1931. The online bookseller Amazon.com began business in July 1995, based in the state of Washington.

Fairs 
 BookExpo America, trade fair
 New York Antiquarian Book Fair (est. 1960)

Clubs 
 Book of the Month Club, subscription business, est. 1926
 Oprah's Book Club, est. 1996
 Fellowship of American Bibliophilic Societies, est. 1993. Members include:
 Book Club of California, San Francisco, California; est. 1912
 The Caxton Club, Chicago, Illinois; est. 1895
 Florida Bibliophile Society, Bayonet Point, Florida; est. 1983
 The Grolier Club, New York, New York; est. 1884
 The Ticknor Society, Boston, Massachusetts; est. 2002

Collections 
Some notable collections of books of the United States include:
 American Antiquarian Society (est. 1812), Worcester, Massachusetts
 Library of Congress (est. 1800), Washington DC

Digitization 
The nonprofit Internet Archive began scanning books in 2004, in the same year that Google Inc. launched Google Book Search. In 2005, Google began scanning pages of volumes in several large research libraries in the US, as part of its new Google Books Library Project. The Open Content Alliance formed in 2005.

Images

Bibliography

Published in 19th century 
  
  1872-
 
  1896-

Published in 20th century 
 
  1905-. (Book reviews)
 
 
 
 
 
 
  1963-
 
 
 
  1979-
 . Chapters include:
 "Institutional Book Collecting in the Old Northwest, 1876-1900" by Terry Belanger
 "Copyright and Books in Nineteenth-century America" by Alice D. Schreyer
 "Dissemination of Popular Books in the Midwest and Far West during the Nineteenth-century" by Madeleine B. Stern
 "Getting the Books Out: trade sales, parcel sales, and book fairs in the nineteenth-century United States" by Michael Winship
  (Includes several articles about books)

Published in 21st century 
 
 
 
 
 . (Discusses BookTube and Booksplosion book club)

See also 

 Copyright law of the United States
 African-American book publishers in the United States, 1960–80
 American literature
 Category:American writers
 Literacy in the United States
 Reading education in the United States
 Book censorship in the United States
 List of most commonly challenged books in the United States
 One City One Book, initiated in Seattle in 1998 ("If All of Seattle Read the Same Book")
 Mass media in the United States and :Category:History of mass media in the United States

Notes

References

External links 

   + "Print Culture"
 Rare Book School (in Virginia) bibliographies:
 History of the Book in America: A Survey from Colonial to Modern
 History of the Book in America, c.1700–1830
 American Book in the Industrial Era, 1820–1940
 .  (Includes articles on American book history)
  (Database created from work of Haynes McMullen)
 

united states
 
 
Libraries in the United States